Zarrin Choqa-ye Sofla (also Romanized as Zarrīn Choqā-ye Soflá; also known as Zarrīn Choghā-ye Soflá, Zarrīn Chaghā-ye Soflá, Shahrak-e Jadīd-e Zarrīn Choqā-ye Soflá, Zarrīn Chaghā Bālā, and Zarrīn Choqā) is a village in Robat Rural District, in the Central District of Khorramabad County, Lorestan Province, Iran. At the 2006 census, its population was 37, in 7 families.

References 

Towns and villages in Khorramabad County